Pseudecheneis ukhrulensis is a species of sisorid catfish found in the Chindwin river basin in Manipur, India.

References

Catfish of Asia
Taxa named by Waikhom Vishwanath 
Taxa named by Achom Darshan Singh
Fish described in 2007
Sisoridae